HD 219279 is a double star in the equatorial constellation of Aquarius. It has three companions.

References

External links
 Image HD 219279

Aquarius (constellation)
219279
Double stars
K-type giants
8836
114750
Durchmusterung objects